"Australian Gate" is an English-language song performed by Austrian singer-songwriter and radio presenter Julian Heidrich. The song was released as a digital download on 3 December 2010. The song peaked at number 26 on the Austrian Singles Chart.

Track listing

Chart performance

Release history

References

2010 songs
2010 singles
Julian Le Play songs